The Essentials is the second greatest hits album by American rapper Ice Cube, released September 16, 2008 on Priority Records.

Track listing 

Note: As track eleven is a live recording, it may have been recorded after 2006; however, the tracks sung are from the cited album.
Track 3 was remastered in 2007.
Tracks marked with an asterisk (*) were remastered in 2008.

References

External links 

Ice Cube albums
2008 greatest hits albums
Gangsta rap compilation albums
West Coast hip hop compilation albums
Priority Records compilation albums
Albums produced by Bud'da
Albums produced by DJ Pooh
Albums produced by DJ Muggs
Albums produced by Laylaw
Albums produced by Lil Jon
Albums produced by Scott Storch